Catholicos Khachik I was the Catholicos of the Armenian Apostolic Church between 973 and 992.

After a one-year vacancy due to a confusing period where there were two rival Catholicoi, King Ashot III "the Merciful" called an assembly to pick a new Catholicos. Khachik, a relative of the Catholicos Ananias was selected and was able to settle the problems which had arisen from the dueling Catholicoi and the schism it caused.

Catholicoi of Armenia
992 deaths
Armenian Oriental Orthodox Christians
Year of birth unknown
10th-century Armenian people
10th-century Oriental Orthodox archbishops